WIVV (1370 AM) is a radio station broadcasting a Religious format. Licensed to Vieques, Puerto Rico, it serves part of Puerto Rico, large areas of the US Virgin Islands, the British Virgin Islands, and the Lesser Antilles. WIVV was the first-ever full-time Christian radio station in the Caribbean. It is currently owned by Calvary Evangelistic Mission, Inc. and features programming from Salem Radio Network.

WIVV is one of three AM radio stations that comprise The Rock Radio Network. The station has its own standalone studio facilities in Vieques. However, most of its programming originates from the main hub of The Rock Radio Network at WBMJ in San Juan, Puerto Rico. Its programming is bilingual and consists largely of biblical teaching in English and in Spanish. WIVV also broadcasts a limited amount of Christian music.

WIVV first went on the air in 1956. It was founded as a missionary outreach station through the work of the American missionaries Don and Ruth Luttrell. They inaugurated the station by airing Handel's "Hallelujah Chorus." In honor of this, The Rock Radio Network ends every "Sharathon" fundraising event with the "Hallelujah Chorus" and prayer. For more on the history of WIVV, see The Rock Radio Network.

Changes to WIVV
In 2008, The Rock Radio Network was in the final stages of a complete renovation of the studio facilities of WIVV. 2008 saw a brand new transmitter, a new studio building, and plans for a new tower. The old studio building was emptied and prepared to be converted into a garage. For more information on WIVV, see The Rock Radio Network.

Translator stations

References

External links

IVV
Radio stations established in 1956
Vieques, Puerto Rico
1956 establishments in Puerto Rico